Gulabrao Maharaj (6 July 1881 – 20 September 1915) was a Hindu saint from Maharashtra, India. A blind person, he was credited with giving a vision of life to the people. He wrote 139 books on various subjects containing more than 6000 pages, 130 commentaries and about 25,000 stanza in poetry in his short life of 34 years.

Biography 
Gulabrao Maharaj was born in a Maharashtrian Kunbi family on 6 July 1881 to Gonduji Mohod and Sou. Alokabai Mohod from the village of Madhan near Amravati. He became blind by being given the wrong medicine at the age of nine months. When he was four years old his mother died, and he was brought up by his maternal grandmother in Loni Takli village.

Shri Sant Dnyaneshwar Maharaj has given him Drushant when he was at the age of 19 years and given him mantra of his own name. After that Drushtant, the first ever photo picture of Sant Dhyaneshwar Maharaj Sant Dnyaneshwar was drawn by an artist based on the directions of Maharaj. Even today, one can see the same photo-frame at the Samadhi Temple at Alandi, Maharashtra. Sant Gulabrao Maharaj was known as Pradnyachakshu Madhuradwaitacharya Gulabrao Maharaj. He was called Pradnyachakshu because he became blind of both the eyes at the age of about nine months; still he was master of Vedanta philosophy and many occult and physical sciences. 'Pradnya' means intelligence and eyes are called "chakshu" in Sanskrit language. He had many divine powers which included the 'intellectual eyesight'. His mind could read and grasp any book in the world in any language that he would take in hand and decide to learn. His mind did not need the body-organ like 'eye' to see the world.

"Madhuradwait" was the new school of thought introduced by him. The people well versed in Vedanta know that 'adwaita' (non-dualism) philosophy of Vedanta does not accept any name and form visible or non-visible that could be different from God (soul, Atma or Brahma). Vedanta very explicitly proclaims, "When everything has become one-soul, where is any other thing to smell ? who will see whom ? who will listen to whom ? who will talk to whom ? where is any other thing to think about ? who will know whom ? how to know him who knows everything ?" (Asy sarva atmaivabhuta, tat ken kam jighnet ? ken kam pashyet ?.. ... brihadaranyaka). "What exists is only one thing i.e. Brahma and what we see and experience as world is illusionary" is the teachings of "adwaita". Madhura Bhakti is the devotional love for lord Krishna. In Vedanta all the three words viz. devotee, devotion and deity are not different from each other where as in Madhura Bhakti one has to be a deity and other a devotee.

Adwaita does not recognize Bhakti at all. Probably the great saint who possessed the eternal knowledge since childhood by dint of providence due to his past karma, had advocated Madhurabhakti for the "after-attaining-knowledge" stage to his disciple.

His full name was Gulab Gundoji Mohod. He was born on July 6, 1881, in a small village named Madhan in Amravati district in Maharashtra and died at the age of 34 i.e. in 1915. Though he had lost his eyesight at an early age, he wrote about 133 books on various subjects containing more than 6000 pages, 130 commentaries and about 25,000 stanza in poetry. His mother died in the year 1885 when he was four years old. He then stayed at the house of his maternal grandmother at the place known as Loni Takli for about six years. In this period people learned of his extraordinary intelligence and his "brain-sight" though he had lost his eye-sight. There was a community well in front of the house where he stayed and the women from the village would come to well for water. Small Gulab would call them all by their names, and the women were surprised that the blind boy knew their individual names. He was often found in deep samadhi stage in the night. Initially his grand mother and others were frightened to see Gulabrao sitting in Yoga position with his respiration stopped completely. However, some elderly and wise men understood the conditions of Gulabrao and asked his relatives to refrain from disturbing him during samadhi. He liked the holy songs (Bhajans), holy verses (Slokas) and reading the occult books. He would ask his friends to read the books and would repeat the contents immediately as was heard by him. He had extraordinary memory. He knew all the Vedas and Shastras at the age of ten years.

He was married to Mankarnika, daughter of Ganaji Bhuyar a farmer in nearby village in the year 1896. He started writing essays and poetry on the religious philosophy since 1897. i.e. from his age of sixteen. Since then he would visit the nearby cities, villages and towns and meet the people to discuss on the various topics of religion. This is incredible but true that in the year 1901 the great saint of 12th century Sant Dnyneshwar Maharaj met Gulabrao and accepted him as his disciple.

Sant Gulabrao Maharaj would call himself to be wife of Lord Krishna and a daughter of Sant Dnyneshwara. He married lord Krishna in the year 1905. He used to put on the dress and the ornaments like woman. He would lay kumkum (a red spot) on his forehead and put on managalsutra (a golden chain with black beads) around his neck which are usually worn by the Hindu married women.

In the year 1902 when he was 21, he wrote the commentary on the theories of Darwin and Spencer. He had written books on various subjects like dhyan, yoga and bhakti and written commentaries on ancient treatises. He wrote on the "Manas Ayurveda", i.e. psychological part in the Ayurveda. He had given valuable guidelines to those who want to attain the salvation and gain the eternal knowledge. It is beyond one's imagination that a blind man could write on the subjects like Yoga, Upanishads and Brahmasutras and many occult sciences which are difficult subjects to understand even by the highly educated and intelligent people. His style of writing is of his own and he has put forth his own views absolutely keeping the Vedic discipline. He has boldly revealed many secrets of the Hindu religious sciences which are not generally made public by the saints.

Though he was from the Kunbi caste, most of his disciples were Brahmin Pundits. He was openly telling people that he had no right to study the Vedas according to old traditions, but he knew Vedas without studying them and since he knew the "Atmadnyan" (knowledge of self-realization) he was not bound by many old rules. He used to respect Vedas, Brahmins and the guidance received from great wealth of old Indian religious treatises.

He was straightforward and would defeat many pundits and intelligent people in the debate on the Shastras (sciences).

It is generally found in India that the great persons who really had lived only for the cause of welfare of mankind were truly recognized by the people after their death only. Samartha Satguru Pradnychakshu Madhuradwaitacharya Saint Gulabrao Maharaj is becoming more and more popular after his Samadhi on 20 September 1915. His many disciples attained the knowledge of self-realization and are known in the public as the great saints. His main disciple, Baba Maharaj Pandit (death 1964) who wrote many books was recognized as a great intellectual, and saint. His commentary on "Bhavartha Deepika" written by Dnyaneshwara Maharaj is published by Geeta Press, Gorakhpur.

The great saints like Gulabrao Maharaj guide the people even after their death by volumes of knowledge written by them.

Earlier life
Sant Gulabrao Maharaj was none other than Swami Becharanand Maharaj in his earlier life/avatar (गुलाबराव महाराजांचे चरित्र) from Zinzuwada Gujrat
1765-1880 born in Sipur village 8 miles from Sidhapur (Matrugaya of today). He has done massive tap/dhyan for 12 years in a jungle near to Naleshwar temple by just having lemons as a food intake. Afterwards he has spent his further life at Rajasbai Mataji Temple Zinzuwada, Gujarat.

How it was come to the notice has a detailed story, but will try to give a brief about it. Balavantrao Marathe originally based in Maharashtra was posted in Zhinzuwada from 1864 to 1867 as a post master. He often used to visit Becharanand maharaj for seeking his blessings with his wife. Post retirement, he returned to his home in Amravati, Maharashtra and one day when he went to the famous Amba Devi temple there, touched the bells and chanted "Jai Jagdamb...", he heard some one referring him by his name "Who's there, Balvantrao Marathe?". Balavantrao looked amazed and went near to the person who has just called his name, he was none other than Gulabrao Maharaj. Maharaj said "Balavantrao, Looks like you've forgotten me" and letter told him "Some of the people from there (Zinzuwada) are also accompanied me today (In this life)!".

After that day Balavantrao regularly used to visit at Gulabrao Maharaj place. Many times devotees insisted Balavantrao to reveal story about how he learned of Maharaj but he tried to avoid it and later he agreed and explained the details about Becharanand Maharaj.

Family tree
The Mohod family of Madhan near Amravati originally migrated from a place near the Gujarat and Rajasthan state border in the 11th century. At the time, the family was known by the surname 'Modh' which later changed to 'Mohod'.

References

Further reading

20th-century Hindu religious leaders
1881 births
Indian blind people
Marathi Hindu saints
1915 deaths